The 1935 Portuguese presidential election was held on 17 February. Óscar Carmona ran unopposed and was reelected.

Results

Notes and references

See also
 President of Portugal
 Portugal
 Politics of Portugal

Presidential elections in Portugal
Portugal
President
Portugal